Veliki Hrib is a dispersed settlement on an elevation on the left bank of the Nevljica River in the Tuhinj Valley in the Upper Carniola region of Slovenia.

Notable people
Notable people that were born or lived in Veliki Hrib include the following:
 (1825–1902), linguist and translator

References

External links

Veliki Hrib on Geopedia

Populated places in the Municipality of Kamnik